Aarni Neuvonen, properly Vadim Rozenberg, also known under the aliases of Aarni Rozenberg and Vadim Petrov, is the largest ever perpetrator of employment fraud in Estonia. He is known for having collected money with promise of overseas jobs from thousands of people and disappearing after having caused over (estimated) 10 million of EEK of damages in 1993.

Scheme 
Neuvonen published in newspapers (mostly Russian) large and eye-catching ads on behalf of Inter Work Corporation, supposedly established in 1930s headquartered in Jerusalem and Bangkok, offering jobs in hotels, pubs and factories in South America, Arabia and Europe. Job-seekers were charged 2335 EEK in advance; the fee was supposed to cover costs of "foreign passport" (note that this Soviet-era relic had long before disappeared from Estonian jurisprudence), visa, airline tickets and Estonian income tax. At that time, the average salary in Estonia was about 1070 EEK, and due to the aftermath of the crash of the GOSPLAN-governed Soviet economy, joblessness was around 17%. (Due to GOSPLAN's main interest being in the military-industrial plants in Northern Estonia, which had been manned primarily by Russophone migrants from Soviet Union transferred to Estonia specifically to work there, the high joblessness affected particularly Russophone people.)

Neuvonen also spread rumours that the first batch of jobs, supposedly scheduled to start working in Germany, at industrial plants of Kodak, had already been fulfilled — thus implying that the number of jobs was limited, and enticing victims to bribe Neuvonen with US$100 (about 1200 EEK at the then-current rates) fee for their positions in the queue to be lifted higher.

After enjoying long queues of jobseekers wanting to pay the fee, Neuvonen announced that the visas, air tickets and job permits would be handed over to everybody on 23 March 1993 in the banquette hall of the Viru Hotel. However, Neuvonen's office, opened on 10 January 1993, was closed already on 9 February 1993, and documents presented by the jobseekers were found in a garbage bin next to the office's door.

Irregularities in licensing 
In the investigation, it was discovered that on one of the company's supposed offices addresses was wasteland, and the other only held an electricity transmission substation — both places unsuitable for offices. Furthermore, three of the people supposedly investing in the company through its incorporation agreement did not exist.

Damages 
Police estimated that at least 3000 people paid Neuvonen the 2335 EEK of advance fee; some analysts have speculated there were up to 5000 victims. After closure of the office, only 32 000 EEK were recovered from one of the company's banking accounts.

Later sightings 
In 1993, Neuvonen, then using the alias of Daniil Rosenberg was reported to be advertising little-used American and Japanese cars for 1000 USD on Ukrainian TV, defrauding hundreds of people out of an estimated million USD.

In 1994, Neuvonen, then presenting himself as a citizen of Norway, was reported to be offering jobs in Europe to poor people in Bulgaria, defrauding about 400 people out of an estimated million USD.

Status 
Neuvonen was never caught, and has been declared dead due to disappearance by an Estonian court at request of his wife of hurried marriage, whom he had fraudulently sold an apartment on Lasnamäe.

See also
 List of fugitives from justice who disappeared

Sources 
 Estonian Criminals
 Postimees 17 December 2005: Õnnis elu Ameerikas
 Postimees 7 February 2009: Superkelm lüpsis raha tuhandetelt ohvritelt by Rasmus Kagge

References

Estonian criminals
Fraudsters
Fugitives
Fugitives wanted by Estonia
People declared dead in absentia
Possibly living people
Year of birth unknown